4/9 may refer to:
April 9 (month-day date notation)
September 4 (day-month date notation)
The fraction equal to approximately 0.44444